The Black Panthers of Thonon is a French American football club based in Thonon-les-Bains (Haute-Savoie) and founded in 1987 by Benoît Sirouet, Nicolas Schpoliansky and Frederic Mériguet.

Jérôme Garnier quickly joined the three founding members and became the first President of the Club.

The first Head Coach of the team was called Jolly Bruno, former player of  Blue Angels of Joinville le Pont.

Now chaired by Benoît Sirouet, the club has led since 2017 by Fabien Ducousso also known as Coach Hippo.

Teams 

The club has four different teams of American football and three flag football.
 The elite team in the first French division, the Diamond Helmet since 2005.
 The reserve is playing in the Romande League of American Football, the NSFL since 2011.
 Juniors, champions of France in 2011.
 Cadets since 2010.
 As three teams flag football (-15 years,-18 years, and +18 years).

Awards

Seniors 
 France's Championship Elite (Diamond Helmet)
 Champion (3): 2013, 2014, 2019
 Vice Champion (3): 2007, 2009, 2012, 2015 
 France's Second Division League (Golden Helmet)
 Champion (1): 2004
 EFL Bowl
 Champions (1): 2017
 EFAF Cup
 Champions (1): 2013
 Finalist (1): 2009

Juniors 
 Junior Championship of France
Champion ** (3): 2004, 2011, 2012 

Vice Champion ** (3): 2006, 2007 and 2008

Flag 
 Championship of France 16
 Champion (1): 2002
 Vice Champion (2): 2008, 2009
 France Championship -16
 Champion (2): 2005, 2006
 Vice Champion (1): 2008
 Regional Championship 16
 Champion (2): 2008, 2009
 Vice Champion (1): 2011
 Regional Championship -16
 Champion (5): 1998, 1997, 2001, 2005, 2006
 Vice Champion (1): 2009, 2011

Season by season

Personalities linked to the club

Staff 

 Benoit Sirouet  Founder, former player and current president
 Nicolas Schpoliansky Founder
 Frederic Mériguet Founder
 Jérôme Garnier  Former President
 Jolly Bruno (player)  Former Head Coach
 Larry Legault  Head Coach, Team HC France, former HC of Gaiters of Bishop's

Notable players 
 Damon Thomas  Former player, WR Wayne State Wildcats, Buffalo Bills
 Dimitri Kiernan  player, former coach (Carabins CIS )
 Tory Cooper  RB, Citadel Athletics NCAA D-1 AA 
 Jason Jackson (player) 
 Patrick Hall (player)  RB
 Stephan Neville  RB (Stonehill College NCAA DII)
 Baylen Laury  RB
 Maxime Sprauel  Player (ex Carabins, CIS)
 Alex Sy  Former player (ex Carabins, CIS)
 Bastien Pereira  Player (future Carabins, CIS) 
 Fred Wells Jr  Former player, RB / WR (Northern Michigan University, NCAA D1-AA)
 Jimmie Russell  Former player, QB (Bethune-Cookman University NCAA D1-AA)
 Brandon Minch  Former player, DE / FB (Wesleyan University, NCAA DIII)
 Chris Dolan, United States Former Player, OL/DL University of Maryland NCAA- D1, 
 John Allanach, Canada Head Coach, former player LB (Mount Allison Mounties, CIS)
 Sundee Jones, Canada Head Coach, former player RB (Mount Allison Mounties, CIS)

Media 

The Black Panthers of Thonon-les-Bains were the first in France to broadcast all of their regular season games live on the Internet.
The BPWEBTV created in 2010 was well-received, and broadened for the 2011 season.

References

External links 
 club's official website in french
 club's official website in english
 Web TV

American football teams in France
1987 establishments in France
American football teams established in 1987
Sport in Haute-Savoie